The River Ash originates near the village of Brent Pelham in North Hertfordshire and flows through The Hadhams (Little, Ford and Much), Widford, Wareside, until it reaches the River Lea near Stanstead Abbots.

References

Ash, River
Ash
1Ash